Puerto Rico Highway 19 (PR-19) is a short highway in Guaynabo. It is the main avenue in San Patricio, Guaynabo. It begins at PR-20 and PR-21 in San Juan and ends an interchange with PR-2 and PR-20 in Guaynabo.

Route description
PR-19 starts at its southern end at an interchange with PR-20 in San Juan. From this terminus, the highway runs through the interchange with PR-20 before intersecting PR-21 and turning northward parallel to the PR-20 freeway on its eastern side. After a short distance, the highway crosses the freeway on Avenida Luis Vigoreaux and then runs northwesterly to cross into Guaynabo. Running due north in Guaynabo, PR-19 passes through two roundabouts and ends at the interchange where PR-20 ends at PR-2.

Major intersections

See also

 List of highways numbered 19

References

External links
 

019